Wirsung may refer to:

 Johann Georg Wirsung, German anatomist
 Pancreatic duct, also called duct of Wirsung